, pen-name for Hideki Nakazono, was one of Japan's pioneer writers of spy fiction.

Nakazono was born in Fukuoka Prefecture, spent from 1938-1946 in China, and died of pneumonia at a hospital in Kawasaki, Kanagawa. He won the 1992 Yomiuri Prize for Peking hanten kyūkan nite.

References 
 Japanese Wikipedia article
 Pioneer of spy fiction Nakazono dies at 81
 Who's who in contemporary Japanese socialists, scholars and writers, Nihon Shakai Undō Kenkyūkai (Japanese Politics Economy Research Institute), 1970, page 401.
 Vox populi, vox dei, Volume 80, Asahi Shinbunsha, Ronsetsu Iinshitsu, (朝日新聞社, 論說委員室), 1990, page 11.

1920 births
2002 deaths
Deaths from pneumonia in Japan
Japanese writers
Japanese crime fiction writers
Mystery Writers of Japan Award winners
Yomiuri Prize winners